Deaf cricket is a version of cricket which is adapted for deaf. It has been governed by the Deaf International Cricket Council (DICC).

History 
The first ever interstate deaf cricket match was held in 1895 in Australia between South Australia and Victoria.

The first ever deaf cricket test match was played between Australia and England in 1992. In the inaugural test match Australia defeated England by 10 wickets. Australia then went onto whitewash the England team 5–0 in the test series.

Deaf International Cricket Council (DICC) 
The DICC eventually built up to improve and promote the deaf cricket globally. DICC is always working for the betterment of world deaf cricket. It conducted three deaf cricket world cups held in different countries.

Regional organizations

England Cricket Association for the Deaf 
The England Cricket Association for the Deaf has been initiated to improve the Deaf cricket in England. The England National Deaf cricket team has been organized by ECAD.

Deaf Cricket – Cricket Victoria 
The Melbourne Deaf Cricket Club (MDCC) was established in 1880–81.

Disability – Surrey Deaf Cricket 
The Surrey Cricket team also give opportunities to deaf cricketers to play at county level.

Indian Deaf Cricket Association 
The IDCA was established in 2020. The India national deaf cricket team has been run and organised by the Indian Deaf Cricket Association.

Pakistan Deaf Cricket Association 
The PDCA rules the Pakistan national deaf cricket team. PDCA also was interested to host the inaugural Deaf T20 World Cup in 2013. PDCA is the association that conducts the deaf cricket of Pakistan. PDCA works under the shadow of  Mr. Zahir Uddin Babar.

National teams 
 Pakistan national deaf cricket team
 England national deaf cricket team
 Sri Lanka national deaf cricket team
 Australia national deaf cricket team
 Indian Deaf cricket team

See also 
 Disabled sports in Australia
 2018 Deaf T20 World Cup

References 

 
Deaf sports
Forms of cricket